Syed Hamid Saeed Kazmi (born 3 October 1957) is a Pakistani politician who served as the 28th Federal Minister for Religious Affairs of Pakistan from 2008 to 2010 as part of the Pakistan People's Party government. He hails from Multan.

Family
Kazmi was born in a well-to-do religious family. His father, Ahmad Saeed Kazmi, was a prominent Sufi and Islamic scholar. He is one among eleven siblings. Kazmi is married and has two daughters and two sons. His father Syed Ahmad Saeed Kazmi son of Syed Muhammad Mukhtar Ahmad Shah Kazmi belonged to Amroha, India. They migrated to Multan in 1935. The family relates with Imam Musa Kazim through 35 steps, and this is why he is called Kazmi.

Education
He obtained a Master of Arts degree in Urdu with Gold Medal from the Bahauddin Zakariya University in 1985.

Political career 
He has been elected MNA on the ticket of PPPP from NA-192 by defeating Makhdoom Syed Ahmad Alam Anwar of PML (Q).

Kazmi was sentenced to sixteen years imprisonment on the basis of charges of corruption by a lower court. The lower court has written in its 87 pages of decision that Hamid Kazmi was not found corrupt at any level but as he was the head of the ministry and by him mismanagement was done. But he appealed against it in the Islamabad High Court. On 20 March 2017, he was acquitted in the Hajj corruption scandal, along with former ex-DG, Hajj Rao Shakeel, and Joint secretary for Religious Affairs, Aftab Aslam.

Assassination attempt
He is a critic of the Pakistani Taliban. On 2 September 2009, while he was the Federal Minister for Religious Affairs, Kazmi survived an assassination attempt by suspected Taliban gunmen. He was shot by motorcycle borne gunmen as he leaving his office. His driver and guard were killed in the attack.

References

1957 births
Living people
Politicians from Multan
Muhajir people
Barelvis
Pakistani Sunni Muslims
Bahauddin Zakariya University alumni
Pakistan People's Party politicians
Hashemite people
Religious Ministers of Pakistan
Pakistani people of Arab descent